Rhabdosciadium is a genus of flowering plants belonging to the family Apiaceae.

Its native range is Western Asia.

Species:
 Rhabdosciadium anatolyi Lyskov & Kljuykov 
 Rhabdosciadium aucheri Boiss.

References

Apioideae